The 28th Annual Japan Record Awards took place at the Nippon Budokan in Chiyoda, Tokyo, December 31, 1986, starting at 6:30PM JST. The primary ceremonies were televised in Japan on TBS.

Award winners 
Japan Record Award:
Akina Nakamori for "DESIRE"
Best Vocalist:
Saburo Kitajima
Best New Artist:
Shonentai
Best Album:
Seiko Matsuda for "SUPREME"

See also 
37th NHK Kōhaku Uta Gassen

External links
Official Website

Japan Record Awards
Japan Record Awards
Japan Record Awards
Japan Record Awards
1986